This is a list of the Spanish PROMUSICAE Top 20 Singles number-ones of 1992.

Chart history

See also
1992 in music
List of number-one hits (Spain)

References

1992
Spain Singles
Number-one singles